Steve Anderson is the Chief of the Metropolitan Nashville Police Department.

Early life
Anderson attended Peabody High School in Trenton, Tennessee. He served in the United States Air Force, and earned a B.S. degree from Belmont University and a J.D. from the Nashville School of Law. He has three sisters.

Metropolitan Nashville Police Department
Anderson joined the Metropolitan Nashville Police Department in 1975, and served in a variety of roles before becoming chief in 2010.

Tenure as chief
During Anderson's tenure as chief, he gained some attention for his approach to persons protesting the 2014 Michael Brown and Eric Garner incidents. Anderson's approach involved a high degree of tolerance for non-violent protest, including having officers greet and shake hands with protesters.

References

External links

Living people
Year of birth missing (living people)
People from Nashville, Tennessee
Chiefs of the Metropolitan Nashville Police Department
United States Air Force airmen
Belmont University alumni
Tennessee lawyers
People from Trenton, Tennessee